The Jean-Louis Lévesque Arena (French: Aréna Jean-Louis Lévesque) is an arena in Moncton, New Brunswick, Canada. The arena has only one rink and is home of the Université de Moncton Aigles Bleus hockey team.  The Arena has a 60 m x 26 m rink and 1,650 permanent seats.

References

Sports venues in Moncton